This article uses a Belgian surname: the surname is Carton de Wiart, not Wiart.

Henry Victor Marie Ghislain, Count Carton de Wiart (31 January 1869 – 6 May 1951) was the prime minister of Belgium from 20 November 1920 to 6 May 1921. He was member of the aristocratic house of Carton de Wiart, his brother Edmond Carton de Wiart was the Grand Marshall of King Baudouin.

Career
Born in Brussels, Carton de Wiart studied law and became a lawyer. In 1894 he founded the cultural review Durendal, together with Pol Demade and Henry Moeller. He was elected to the Belgian House of Representatives as a left-wing Catholic Party member in 1896. He remained a Member of Parliament until his death in 1951.

Besides serving as prime minister from 1920 to 1921 in a government of national union (Christian Democrats, Liberals and Socialists), he served as minister of justice from 1911 to 1918, as Belgian delegate to the League of Nations from 1928 to 1935, and as minister of social welfare from 1932 to 1934. After the German invasion of Belgium in May 1940, Carton de Wiart accompanied the Belgian government into exile in London.

Having been given the honorific title of Minister of State, Carton de Wiart again served as minister of justice for a short time in 1950. A road in Jette, Belgium, is named in his honour: Avenue Carton de Wiart.

The British general Sir Adrian Carton de Wiart (1880-1963) was the cousin of Henry Carton de Wiart.

Honours 
 :
 Croix Civique, First Class
 Minister of State, by royal decree
 Grand Officer in the Order of Leopold, by royal decree of 13 November 1919
 Grand Cordon in the Order of Leopold
 Knight Grand Cross in the Order of the Crown
Foreign honours
 Knight Grand Cross in the Order of Saints Michael and George
 Knight Grand Cross in the Order of Saints Maurice and Lazarus
 Grand Officer of the Order of Saint-Charles
 Pro Ecclesia et Pontifice

References

External links
 Henry Carton De Wiart in ODIS - Online Database for Intermediary Structures 

1869 births
1951 deaths
Belgian Ministers of State
Catholic Party (Belgium) politicians
Counts of Belgium
Politicians from Brussels
Prime Ministers of Belgium
Belgian Roman Catholics
Belgian Ministers of Justice
Members of the Académie royale de langue et de littérature françaises de Belgique
Belgian magazine founders